Kjartan Rødland (born 29 November 1938) is a Norwegian journalist and newspaper editor, and author of several books.

Career
Rødland was born in the village of Bolstadøyri in Voss. He started working as journalist from 1956, first in the newspaper Dagen, and then in Raumnes from 1957. He worked for the Bodø newspaper  from 1960 to 1963, for Helgeland Arbeiderblad from 1963 to 1967, for Fædrelandsvennen in Kristiansand from 1967 to 1969, and for Bergens Tidende from 1969 to 1971. From 1972 to 1977 he was appointed head of the communications department in the municipality of Bergen. He was chief editor of the newspaper Bergens Tidende from 1977 to 1986. He has written more than thirty books, mostly on regional issues.

Rødland was awarded the King's Medal of Merit in 2012.

References

1938 births
Living people
People from Voss
Norwegian newspaper editors
Norwegian non-fiction writers
Bergens Tidende editors